Jurak may refer to:

People
 Darija Jurak (born 1984), Croatian tennis player
 Drago Jurak (1911–1994), Croatian painter
 Ed Jurak (born 1957), American baseball player
 Goran Jurak (born 1977), Slovenian basketball player
 Ljudevit Jurak (1881–1945), Croatian pathologist

Places
 Jurak-e Nasibollah, a village in Kohgiluyeh and Boyer-Ahmad Province, Iran
 Jurak-e Nowzar, a village in Kohgiluyeh and Boyer-Ahmad Province, Iran
 Jurak, Zanjan, a village in Zanjan Province, Iran
 Jorak, Malaysia, on state route Jalan Jorak in Johor